Pseudochlorella is a genus of green algae in the family Koliellaceae.

Species
, AlgaeBase accepts three species:
 Pseudochlorella pringsheimii  (Shihar & Krauss) Darienko & al. 
 Pseudochlorella pyrenoidosa  (Zeitler) J.W.G.Lund 
 Pseudochlorella signiensis  (Friedl & O'Kelly) Darienko & Pröschold

References

External links

Trebouxiophyceae genera
Prasiolales